Italy women's junior national softball team is the junior national team for Italy.  The team competed at the 1987 ISF Junior Women's World Championship in Oklahoma City, Oklahoma where they finished ninth. The team competed at the 1991 ISF Junior Women's World Championship in Adelaide, Australia where they had 3 wins and 8 losses.  The team competed at the 1995 ISF Junior Women's World Championship in Normal, Illinois where they finished ninth.  The team competed at the 1999 ISF Junior Women's World Championship in Taipei, Taiwan where they finished eleventh.  The team competed at the 2007 ISF Junior Women's World Championship in Enschede, Netherlands where they finished twelfth.

References

External links 
 International Softball Federation

Softball
Women's national under-18 softball teams
Softball in Italy
Youth sport in Italy